Theretra floresica is a moth of the  family Sphingidae. It is known from Flores, part of the eastern Lesser Sunda Islands of Indonesia.

References

Theretra
Moths described in 2010